A Chequered retreat, (retraite en échiquier, Fr.) is so called from the several component parts of a pre-mechanised line or battalion, which alternately retreat and face about in the presence of an enemy, exhibiting the figure of the chequered squares upon a chess board.

See also
List of established military terms

Notes

References

Military science
Tactical formations